Billy Barber (1928 – June 2004) was an Australian boxer. He competed in the men's lightweight event at the 1948 Summer Olympics. At the 1948 Summer Olympics, he lost to Joseph Vissers of Belgium.

References

1928 births
2004 deaths
Australian male boxers
Olympic boxers of Australia
Boxers at the 1948 Summer Olympics
Place of birth missing
Commonwealth Games medallists in boxing
Commonwealth Games silver medallists for Australia
Boxers at the 1950 British Empire Games
Lightweight boxers
Medallists at the 1950 British Empire Games